Amer Al Kaabi  is a Qatar football goalkeeper who played for Qatar in the 2000 Asian Cup. He also played for Al Ahli and Al Ittihad (later renamed Al Gharrafa).

External links
Amer Al-Kaabi at playmakerstats.com (English version of calciozz.it)

1971 births
Living people
Qatari footballers
Qatar international footballers
1992 AFC Asian Cup players
Footballers at the 1992 Summer Olympics
Olympic footballers of Qatar
2000 AFC Asian Cup players
Al Ahli SC (Doha) players
Al-Gharafa SC players
Qatar Stars League players
Association football goalkeepers
Footballers at the 1994 Asian Games
Asian Games competitors for Qatar